The South Tynedale Railway is a preserved,  narrow gauge heritage railway in Northern England and at 875ft is England's second highest  narrow gauge railway after the Lynton and Barnstaple Railway in north Devon. The South Tynedale line runs from Alston in Cumbria, down the South Tyne Valley, via Gilderdale, Kirkhaugh and Lintley, then across the South Tyne, Gilderdale and Whitley Viaducts to Slaggyford in Northumberland.

Former line
The narrow gauge railway line is built on the track bed of the southern section former Alston Line, a standard gauge branch line between Haltwhistle and Alston which was closed by British Rail in May 1976.

Operations
The railway is operated by a charity, The South Tynedale Railway Preservation Society, which was registered in 1983.

Passenger trains operate on the railway from Spring to Autumn and attract 40,000 people to the district every year.  Information about exact dates are on the railway's web site www.south-tynedale-railway.org.uk Special trains operate including Santa Special trains on certain days in December each year.  Although no Santa trains ran in 2011 as volunteer efforts were put into completing the extension to Lintley in time for the 2012 season, they ran again in 2012 on two successive weekends, 15–16 and 22–23 December.  In 2013 Santa trains ran on 14–15 and 21–22 December.

At Alston station there is a cafe and gift shop both operated by the railway company.

The line is currently  in length, having been extended by a further  to Slaggyford in July 2017. The STR is built on the southern section of the trackbed of the disused  standard gauge Haltwhistle to Alston Branch Line, which formerly connected with the Newcastle and Carlisle Railway at Haltwhistle.

The popular South Tyne Trail shares the trackbed with the railway, fenced off for safety.  It is a walking and cycle trail that provides a cut-off for part of its length for the Pennine Way national trail.

The standard gauge branch line was closed by British Rail on 1 May 1976. The track bed is mostly intact, except at Lambley, where the station house and garden are in private ownership, and near Haltwhistle, where construction of the A69 Haltwhistle by-pass road severed the trackbed on the bypass itself and on an adjoining secondary road. The Society hope to eventually reopen the branch all the way to Haltwhistle.

Signalling Infrastructure
The signal box at Alston was dismantled when British Rail closed the branch so a new box had to be sought and erected.  The replacement signal box at Alston formerly stood at Ainderby, on the branch line to Redmire, prior to being acquired from British Rail and re-erected on a new brick base. The level crossing barriers and mechanism came from the now-closed How Mill Station on the Newcastle and Carlisle line.

The signal box houses a 21 lever frame, made by McKenzie and Holland. In addition there is a manually operated gate machine to control the level crossing barriers – this combination of manual gate wheel and lifting barriers (rather that gates) being somewhat rare in the UK.  The frame has had a chequered life as it was constructed for the Highland Railway by McK&H and first installed at Kingussie in Scotland. It was removed in 1926 when a replacement level crossing mechanism was installed in an emergency.

The frame had developed a crack and had to be sent to England to be repaired by Westinghouse, which had taken over McKenzie and Holland in 1920.  The frame was then installed on the North Staffordshire Section of the LMS when a road at a level crossing was realigned to cross the railway.  The old frame with the gate mechanism at this box was inadequate because of worn bearings so the repaired spare frame from Kingussie was installed by Westinghouse. It remained in service until the NS signal box closed. The frame was then sold to the South Tynedale railway and installed at its present location.

The signals are standard BR ones using a former LMS design, although the signal to the carriage sidings is an unusual semaphore ground signal mounted onto a conventional signal post.

Developments
Confirmation was received in November 2009 that a grant of £100,000 had been awarded by the Groundwork UK Community Spaces programme which will be used to fund the restoration of three historic railway bridges on the former Haltwhistle to Alston line.
Northumberland County Council's west area committee also granted consent for a completely new station at Lintley and the new extension to Lintley opened to traffic on 1 April 2012. Rails extend across Lintley viaduct for a distance of about 200 metres from the new station to form a headshunt for works trains.

The extended line from Kirkhaugh to Lintley Halt was officially opened in Saturday 12 May 2012 by Lord Inglewood, a long-time friend of the railway society.

On the same day Cumbria County Council handed over documents confirming a Community Asset Transfer of the Society's leased land in Cumbria.  Work to gain a similar status in Northumberland is ongoing with Northumberland County Council.

In September 2012 the Heritage Lottery Fund made an award that allows development work on a full bid for the Slaggyford extension to proceed.  The bid also included innovative 'green' initiatives to update the railway's buildings, equipment and infrastructure in and around Alston.  The final outcome of the bid is anticipated in January 2014.

In December 2012 a serious wash-out of a retaining wall about 50 metres north of Alston Station threatened to stop the popular Santa trains.  Quick work by the railway's track gang to skew the main running line saved the day.  The STR was left with a significant fund-raising issue to fully repair the 160-year-old wall, restore the lineside footpath and return the line to use.  Temporary repairs were completed by mid-January 2013 whilst fundraising efforts continued to achieve a full repair.  The main line was moved back to its proper alignment before the 2013 season began.

During January 2013 the railway society's ambitions that, one day, trains will again run all the way from Alston to Haltwhistle moved a couple of steps closer.  British Railways Board (Residuary) Ltd. improved upon and changed an earlier offer that now transfers a 7-metre wide strip of land to the society.  The land runs parallel to the Alston bay platform at Haltwhistle mainline station and provides sufficient space for proper station and run-round facilities for narrow gauge trains.  This important step allows the society to approach Network Rail for agreement to use its land alongside the platform and the platform itself.  Additionally a small parcel of land that allows access to the station area from the Alston Arches Viaduct will be made available to the railway society.

In early February, the South Tynedale Railway joined the Heritage Skills Initiative and an engineering skills trainee will join the South Tynedale's mainly volunteer workforce in March.  The one-year project is in partnership with the North of England Civic Trust backed by a bursary and supported by the Heritage Lottery Fund.  The scheme is specifically aimed at overcoming skills shortages in traditional engineering crafts.  The new trainee will work alongside the railway's skilled volunteer engineers looking after the railway's locomotives and rolling stock. The new member of the railway's team concentrated on developing a new works train to support the STR's specialist permanent way team as they prepared for work on the  extension from Lintley Halt to Slaggyford. The opening of the new extension was delayed, and finally opened in June 2018.

At the Annual General Meeting in November 2013 the railway society's chairman signed agreements that handed responsibility for the viaducts at Lambley and Haltwhistle to the society. They were formerly owned by the now defunct North Pennine Heritage Trust.  This important acquisition lays down further building blocks towards the society's aim to eventually reopen the full length of the branch line.

On 4 February 2014 the STR announced a £5.5 million development project that includes just over £4.2 million awarded by the Heritage Lottery Fund.(source HLF and STR press information releases)

2020 closure and administration
The railway did not operate at all during 2020 due to the COVID-19 pandemic and in September 2020 the operating company, South Tynedale Railway Ltd, went into administration.  The attraction was awarded emergency funding from the Government, and it hopes to reopen in 2021.

Stations

Locomotives
Naklo – Polish built  No. 10 of 1957 - undergoing overhaul. Side tanks and a new boiler have been constructed as part of the overhaul. Forecast for completion later in 2020.
Thomas Edmondson – Henschel  No. 6 of 1918 - (Returned to Germany)
Green Dragon – Hunslet Engine Company  No. 16 of 1937 – in ticket and operational, restoration completed in 2018.
Barber – Thomas Green & Son  No. 441 of 1908 – in ticket and operational, restoration completed in 2015.
Class ML 740 - Orenstein & Koppel  No. 2343 of 1907 - stored awaiting overhaul.
Naworth Hudswell Clarke No. 4 of 1952 – operational.
Hunslet  No. 9 of 1952 – operational.
Cumbria Hunslet  No. 11 of 1967 – operational.
Old Rusty Hudswell Clarke  No. 18 of 1961 – operational.
NG25 Baguley-Drewry  No. 3704 of 1973 - operational.

Passenger rolling stock
Trains are made up daily depending on predicted passenger numbers.  There are four all-steel open-ended gallery coaches built by a contractor in Alston, two wooden-bodied coaches and two brake vans constructed in the railway workshops.  Additions to the fleet in 2011 were an all-steel buffet coach, originally built by Gloucester Carriage and Wagon for Sierra Leone Railways, and re-gauged from 750mm to 610mm for use at Alston, and a re-gauged former Romanian steel coach now converted to be fully accessible for disabled passengers.

2018 Season
The timetable shows three return trips from Alston to Slaggyford. Outward trains leave from Alston at 1045, 1315 and 1515 hours.  Return trains leave Slaggyford 55 minutes later.  All trains stop at Kirkhaugh (reduced to a wayside halt) and Lintley. Trains run from late March until mid November but not every day. There are a series of special events spread over the year when special timetables may apply (source STRPS website).

References

External links 

 

Heritage railways in Cumbria
Heritage railways in Northumberland
2 ft gauge railways in England